Dick Hatton (born Clarence Edward Hatton, 1891 - July 9, 1931) was an American actor in silent films. He had leading roles in productions from various studios including Arrow Pictures and Rayart Pictures films including Temporary Sheriff.

Hatton was born in Kentucky. He died at age 40 after an automobile accident.

Selected filmography
Cactus Cure
Two Fisted Justice (1924), an Arrow Pictures production
Temporary Sheriff
Fearless Dick (1922)
 Blood Test (1923)
 Where Romance Rides (1925)
 Scar Hanan (1925)
 Tonio, Son of the Sierras (1925)
 Speeding Hoofs (1927)
 The Boss of Rustler's Roost (1928)
 Romance of the West (1930)

References

External links

1891 births
1931 deaths
American male film actors
Actors from Kentucky
20th-century American male actors